Netarde is a small village in sawantwadi taluka (Dist. Sindhudurg, state- Maharashtra). Eastern and Southern  region is covered by small river which separates the two states Maharashtra and Goa. The civic Body is Netarde Gram Panchayat. Main occupation in the area include agriculture(Crops - Rice, Ragi (nachani), Groundnut, Coconut, Cashew, Kokum, banana, betel nut, Cow Peas, Chilly etc. The main religion is Hindu and languages spoken include Malvani, Konkani and Marathi. The major markets are Banda (Maharashtra) and Mapusa (Goa).

Location
Netarde is a village in Sawantwadi Taluk in Sindhudurg District in Maharashtra State in India . It is 18 km from its Taluk city Sawantwadi and 45 km from its District Main City Oros. It is 500 km from the State Capital Mumbai, and 40 to 45 km from Panjim capital of Goa.

Transport
Maharashtra state Transport (ST) bus is available from Banda to Netarde, a private bus service is also available from Banda (Patradevi) and Mapusa Goa
The nearest railway stations to the village are Pernem (Goa) about 18 km away, Thivim (Goa) about 25 km from the village and Sawantwadi railway station 20 km away.

The nearest Airport is Dabolim Airport in Goa approximately 60 to 65 km from the village.

Festival
Ganesh Chaturthi is biggest festival, the people's response for Holi (rangpachami) and Jatra is also considerable.
Some of the festivals which are celebrated in Netarde village
 Ganesh Chaturthi
 Shimgostav
 Diwali
 Nagpanchami
 Gudhi Padwa
 Watpaurnima
 Makar Sankranti
 Narali Paurnima
 Rakshabandhan
 Vijayadashami (dasara)
 Tulsi Vivah

References

Villages in Sindhudurg district